Alan Stuart Cheuse (January 23, 1940 – July 31, 2015) was an American writer, editor, professor of literature, and radio commentator. A longtime NPR book commentator, he was also the author of five novels, five collections of short stories and novellas, a memoir and a collection of travel essays. In addition, Cheuse was a regular contributor to All Things Considered. His short fiction appeared in respected publications like The New Yorker, Ploughshares, The Antioch Review, Prairie Schooner, among other places. He taught in the Writing Program at George Mason University and the Community of Writers.

Early life 
Cheuse was born in Perth Amboy, New Jersey. Cheuse grew up in a Jewish family, the son of a Russian immigrant father and a mother of Russian and Romanian descent. Cheuse graduated from Perth Amboy High School in 1957.

Education 
Cheuse graduated from Rutgers University in 1961. After traveling abroad and working for several years at writing and editing jobs, Cheuse returned to Rutgers University to study for a Ph.D. in Comparative Literature, which he was awarded in 1974. Cheuse wrote a thesis on the life and work of the Cuban novelist Alejo Carpentier.

Cheuse taught literature at Bennington College for nearly a decade and then took posts at Sewanee: The University of the South, the University of Virginia, and the University of Michigan

Career 
Cheuse joined the faculty at George Mason University in the M.F.A. program and taught fiction. For over 25 years, he taught summers at the Community of Writers at Squaw Valley and also served on its board of directors.

In the late 1970s Cheuse began publishing short fiction, beginning with a  story in The New Yorker, followed with articles for Ploughshares, The Antioch Review, Prairie Schooner, and New Letters. He published his first novel, a biographical historical work about John Reed and Louise Bryant in 1982. Other works of fiction and nonfiction followed.

Cheuse was a regular book reviewer for the NPR radio program All Things Considered. In 1999, Cheuse also helped to found Fall for the Book, a nonprofit literary festival.

Personal life 
Cheuse was involved in a serious car crash on July 14, 2015, on California State Route 17 while driving from Olympic Valley to Santa Cruz, California. Cheuse was reported to be in a coma on July 20, 2015 with injuries including fractured ribs, cervical vertebrae, and an acute subdural hematoma. 
On July 31, 2015, Cheuse died from his auto accident injuries in San Jose, California. He was 75.

Legacy
Alan Cheuse's papers reside at the Albert and Shirley Small Special Collections Library at the University of Virginia.

Bibliography

Books
 Candace and Other Stories. Cambridge, Massachusetts: Apple-wood Press, 1980.  (short story collection)
 The Bohemians: John Reed & His Friends Who Shook the World. Cambridge, Massachusetts: Apple-wood Books, 1982.  (novel)
 The Grandmothers' Club. Salt Lake City: Peregrine Smith Books, 1986.  (novel)
 Fall Out of Heaven. Salt Lake City: G. M. Smith, 1987.  (memoir)
  (novel)
 The Tennessee Waltz and Other Stories. Salt Lake City: Peregrine Smith Books, 1990.  (short story collection)
 Lost and Old Rivers: Stories. Dallas, Tex.: Southern Methodist University Press, 1998.  (short story collection)
  (essays)
  (novellas)
  (novel)
  (travel essays, 2009)
  (novel)
 Paradise, Or, Eat Your Face. Santa Fe Writers Project, 2012.  (novellas)
 An Authentic Captain Marvel Ring & Other Stories. Santa Fe Writers Project, 2014.  (short stories)
 Prayers for the Living. London: Fig Tree Books, 2015.

Selected short fiction
 “Vishnu, Sleeping on the Cosmic Ocean,” The Antioch Review, summer 2013
 "Pip: A Story In Three Parts," Michigan Quarterly Review Volume 51, Issue 1, Winter 2012. Based on the character Pip in Herman Melville's Moby Dick
 “When the Stars Threw Down Their Spears and Watered Heaven with Their Tears” (novella), The Idaho Review, 2011
 “A Merry Little,” ACM, #48, Winter, 2009
 “An Authentic Captain Marvel Ring,” Superstition Review, Fall, 2008
 “A Little Death,” The Southern Review, Summer, 2007
 “Thirty-Five Passages Over Water,” The Antioch Review, Fall, 2006
 “Moonrise, Hernandez, New Mexico, 1941,” New Letters, Fall, 2006
 “In the Kauri Forest,” Ploughshares, Fall, 2006
 “Gribnis,” Prairie Schooner, Winter, 2006
 “Horse Sacrifice and the Shaman’s Ascent to the Sky,” The Land-Grant College Review, Winter, 2005
 “Paradise, Or, Eat Your Face,” (novella), The Idaho Review, Winter, 2004
 “Revels,” Southern California Anthology, Summer, 2004
 “Days Given Over to Travel,” Prairie Schooner, Summer, 2003

Edited works
 With Lisa Alvarez et al. Writing Workshop in a Book: The Squaw Valley Community of Writers on the Art of Fiction. San Francisco: Chronicle Books, 2007.
 Seeing Ourselves: Great Early American Short Stories. 2007.
 With Nicholas Delbanco. Literature: Craft & Voice, Vols. 1–3. 2nd ed. McGraw-Hill, 2012.

References

External links
Alan Cheuse's official website
 George Mason profile
Littoral  interview with Alan Cheuse about his novel To Catch the Lightning, (2008)
Public radio interview with Alan Cheuse about historical fiction and his novel To Catch the Lightning, (2008)
 Tennessee Writers Project biography
Alan Cheuse bio at NPR
Santa Fe Writers Project
Alan Cheuse on 'Song of Slaves in the Desert'
 An Authentic Captain Marvel Ring: Perth Amboy, New Jersey, C. 1947

1940 births
2015 deaths
American literary critics
20th-century American novelists
American people of Russian-Jewish descent
American people of Romanian-Jewish descent
Bennington College faculty
George Mason University faculty
Jewish American novelists
People from Perth Amboy, New Jersey
Rutgers University alumni
Sewanee: The University of the South faculty
University of Michigan faculty
University of Virginia faculty
Novelists from New Jersey
Novelists from Virginia
21st-century American novelists
American male novelists
American male short story writers
NPR personalities
Perth Amboy High School alumni
Road incident deaths in California
Deaths from subdural hematoma
20th-century American short story writers
21st-century American short story writers
20th-century American male writers
21st-century American male writers
Novelists from Michigan
Novelists from Tennessee
Novelists from Vermont
20th-century American non-fiction writers
21st-century American non-fiction writers
American male non-fiction writers
21st-century American Jews